This was the first edition of the tournament.

Irina Bara and Chantal Škamlová won the title after defeating Alexandra Cadanțu and Tereza Smitková 7–6(9–7), 6–4 in the final.

Seeds

Draw

References
Main Draw

Ladies Open Dunakeszi - Doubles